Karl Åke Nilsson (born 29 April 1945) is a retired Swedish javelin thrower. In 1968 he won the national title and set a national record at 87.76 m, which ranked him #3 in the world and was enough for an Olympic bronze medal. He threw a mere 83.48 m in the 1968 Olympic final and placed sixth.

References

1945 births
Living people
Athletes (track and field) at the 1968 Summer Olympics
Olympic athletes of Sweden
Swedish male javelin throwers